Orsay is a commune in the southwestern suburbs of Paris, France.

Orsay may also refer to:

 Orsay, Inner Hebrides, an island in Scotland
 Orsay (operating system), a proprietary operating system made by Samsung; see NetCast

See also
D’Orsay (disambiguation)